A Revolutionary Knitting Circle is an activist group that uses craftivism (specifically knitting and other textile handicrafts) in its efforts to bring about social change.

The first Revolutionary Knitting Circle group was founded in Calgary, Canada, by Grant Neufeld in 2000. Since then, groups have formed across Canada, in the United States, and various parts of Europe.

Purpose 
The groups claim three main goals:

Promoting community independence 
They hold that communities and nations are currently subject to the corporate rule and that a goal of the Revolutionary Knitting Circles is to return them to independence from that rule.

While not advocating an end to trade (be it local or international), the groups are working to build the capacity for all necessary subsistence production at the community level. The theory being that, with the ability to take care of all essential needs, communities will be in a position to say no to trade deals they do not want.

Breaking down social divisions 
The Revolutionary Knitting Circles oppose various social divisions, including age, gender, race and class. The groups actively seek to include a diverse range of people from across those divisions in cooperative efforts.

This goal is also served by having the groups often publicly represented by youthful males (such as the founder).
Given the common view of knitting as work associated with middle- and lower-class women – typically older women – the groups hope that this representation will help to counter stereotypes.

Changing how activism is done 
The groups hope to increase participation in activism by offering a different approach from the often intense, and sometimes hostile, modes of activism most commonly associated with social justice movements.

History of actions 
The first major action initiated by the Revolutionary Knitting Circle was the Global Knit-In held during the 2002 G8 Summit. Groups in a number of cities and towns hosted protest rallies featuring knitting outside of major corporate sites, especially bank office towers. Notable among these was the mass rally held in Ottawa, Canada, where protesters set up a 'social safety net' made of knitted squares.

In 2003 the group produced a pattern for white knitted arm-bands with a peace symbol. Members of the Knitting Circles and other interested knitters produced numerous arm-bands from the pattern which were worn in the mass peace marches and rallies held that year.

In 2004 the group produced a pattern for a banner displaying the words "Peace Knits". The pattern called for individual 6 inch squares to be stitched together – allowing for many knitters to contribute to a single banner.

See also 
 Sewing circle
Tricoteuse

References

Organizations established in 2000
Advocacy groups in Canada
International organizations based in Canada
Knitting organizations
2000 establishments in Canada